The , also called New Tram, is an automated guideway transit line in Suminoe-ku, Osaka, Japan. The line is operated by Osaka Metro, and was constructed to serve as the main public transportation for newly built Osaka South Port habitations and facilities. An extension of the line from Cosmosquare to Trade Center-mae was once owned and operated by an Osaka City's subsidiary, . The operation of the section was later merged to Osaka City transportation itself to increase the number of passengers by reducing fares previously calculated separately.

Stations
All stations are in Suminoe-ku, Osaka.

Rolling stock
, the following train types are used on the line, all formed as four-car sets.

 200 series four-car sets (since 29 June 2016)

200 series

A fleet of four-car 200 series trainsets was introduced between 2016 and March 2017, all finished in different colour liveries. The first set, 01, entered revenue service on 29 June 2016, followed by the second set, 02, in October 2016.

, the 200 series fleet consists of twenty sets (numbered 01 to 21 (excluding 13)), and formed as follows. The trains have stainless steel bodies.

Former rolling stock
 100 series (1981–2001)
 100A series (1991-2019)

History
March 16, 1981 – The Nankō Port Town Line from Nakafuto to Suminoekōen opened.
October 5, 1993 – Operations were suspended due to an accident that occurred at Suminoekōen Station; operations resumed on November 19, 1993.
December 18, 1997 – The Osaka Port Transport System Co., Ltd.  from Cosmosquare to Nakafutō opened.
July 1, 2005 – The OTS New Tram Technoport Line was merged to the Nankō Port Town Line.

Statistics
Distance: 7.9 km (incl. former OTS Line 1.3 km)
Power: 600 V three phase AC, side contact
Line color: cerulean blue
Symbol letter: P

See also
 Transport in Keihanshin
 List of rapid transit systems

References

Rail transport in Osaka Prefecture
Railway lines opened in 1981